Church of the Holy Trinity is an Episcopal church on Rittenhouse Square in Philadelphia.  The first service in the church building, designed by Scottish architect John Notman, was held on March 27, 1859.  The corner tower was added in 1867 and was designed by George W. Hewitt of the firm of Fraser, Furness & Hewitt. It is designed in the simpler "low church" style, rather than the fancier "high church" or Anglo-Catholic style of Notman's nearby St. Marks Episcopal Church.

The church's rector from 1862 to 1869 was Phillips Brooks, who was also the author of the lyrics to the familiar Christmas carol "O Little Town of Bethlehem".  Renowned (and sometimes reviled) for his ebullient homilies and his staunch opposition to slavery, Brooks delivered a eulogy to Abraham Lincoln in the church on April 23, 1865, following the U.S. President's assassination on April 14. This sermon was reprinted and widely read. After the end of the American Civil War, Brooks took a sabbatical from the church to travel to Europe, Israel and Palestine. His visit to Bethlehem inspired him to write a poem for his Sunday School students, and for the church's 1868 Christmas season he had church organist Louis Redner set the poem to music. The result was “O Little Town of Bethlehem."

In 1869, Brooks became rector of Trinity Church, Boston, where he oversaw the design, decoration and construction of Trinity's new Back Bay facility from 1872 to 1877 following the original church's destruction in Boston's Great Fire of 1872.

The church's rector from 1899 to his death in 1932 was rev. Floyd W. Tomkins.

Philadelphia's Church of the Holy Trinity is also known for its numerous stained-glass windows, including five by Louis Comfort Tiffany and one by Luc-Olivier Merson.

The church was listed on the National Register of Historic Places in 1973.

Today, the Church of the Holy Trinity's mission is, "In the name of Christ to deepen our faith, to enlarge our community and to act on our beliefs." Sunday services are at 8:30 and 11 am; with a special service for children and families called "Joyful Noise" at 9:45 on the first Sunday of the month. CHT is a welcoming and affirming community where all are welcome.

Leadership

Vestry 
The current vestry is composed of 12 members of the congregation.

Rectors
Alexander Hamilton Vinton (1858-1861)
Phillips Brooks (1862-1869)
Thomas Augustus Jaggar (1870-1875)
William Neilson McVickar (1876-1898)
Floyd Williams Tomkins (1899-1932)
Howard Robert Weir (1933-1937)
Edgar Frank Salmon (1938-1951)
Harry S. Longley (1951-1961)
Cuthbert Pratt (1961-1979)
Norman S. Kerr (1980-1983) 
John Arthur Smart (-1996)
Terence Chaus Roper (1999-)
Alan James Robert Neale (2004-2015)
John Gardner and Rachel Gardner (co-rectors)

References

External links 

Annual Reports of the Parish Association/Parochial Committee of the Church of the Holy Trinity, Rittenhouse Square (1863-1888)

Historic American Buildings Survey in Philadelphia
Episcopal churches in Pennsylvania
Properties of religious function on the National Register of Historic Places in Philadelphia
Churches in Philadelphia
Churches completed in 1857
Romanesque Revival church buildings in Pennsylvania
Rittenhouse Square, Philadelphia
19th-century Episcopal church buildings
Churches on the National Register of Historic Places in Pennsylvania
1859 establishments in Pennsylvania